Rinehart Peak is a peak (1,710 m) which rises from a ridge on the east-central slopes of Pomerantz Tableland, in the Usarp Mountains. The feature stands at the south side of the head of Helfferich Glacier. Mapped by United States Geological Survey (USGS) from surveys and U.S. Navy aerial photographs, 1960–62. Named by Advisory Committee on Antarctic Names (US-ACAN) for Floyd J. Rinehart, United States Antarctic Research Program (USARP) geophysicist at McMurdo Station, 1967–68.

Mountains of Victoria Land
Pennell Coast